Theological fiction is fictional writing which shapes people's attitudes towards theological beliefs. It is typically instructional or exploratory rather than descriptive, and it engages specifically with the theoretical ideas which underlie and shape typical responses to religion. Theological fiction, as a concept, is used by both theists and atheists, such as in fictional pantheons and cultures in theological fantasy literature.

Theological and religious fiction
The subject matter of theological novels often overlaps with philosophical novels, particularly when it deals with issues from natural theology (also called philosophy of religion). For example, Roger Olsen notes that the problem of evil is a feature of some significant theological fiction.

Theological fiction also overlaps with religious fiction or Christian novels (also called inspirational fiction), especially when dealing with complex ideas such as redemption, salvation and predestination, which have a direct bearing on attitudes towards religious practices. Some authors try to distinguish a theological novel as one which denotes a more idea driven plot, rather than a novel which is about people who happen to be interacting with religion, but the distinction often proves difficult to sustain when ideas and actions are closely interwoven, each influencing the other.

Theological short stories
Examples of the genre (also called novellae) include:

Candide (1759) by Voltaire
Book of Judith (1st Century BC) by Anonymous
"Hell Is the Absence of God" (2001) by Ted Chiang

Theological long fiction
Examples of theological long fiction include:

Philosophus Autodidactus (originally Hayy ibn Yaqdhan) (12th century) by Ibn Tufail
Theologus Autodidactus (originally The Treatise of Kāmil on the Prophet's Biography) (1268) by Ibn al-Nafis
Divine Comedy (1320) by Dante Alighieri
The Pilgrim's Progress (1678) by John Bunyan
The Brothers Karamazov (1880) by Fyodor Dostoevsky
The Lion, the Witch and the Wardrobe (1950) by C. S. Lewis
Silence (1966) by Shūsaku Endō
The Shack (2007) by William P. Young

Linked series of theological fiction
Individual stories can be linked in series to constitute a composite novel or a short story cycle, where a group of stories interact to convey a richer or fuller story than any of the single elements can.

Examples of linked series of theological fiction include:

The Journey Series by Richard P Belcher. It comprises 20 novels exploring Calvinist Theology.

See also
Christian novel
List of Christian novels
List of Catholic authors
Religious ideas in fantasy fiction
Religious ideas in science fiction
Religious fiction

References

 
 
 
Christian literature
Christianity in fiction
Fiction about religion
Novels about religion